Danube International School Vienna (DISV) is a private international school in Vienna, Austria. located in the Second District, between the Donaukanal and the Prater. 

The school is privately owned and managed, but is accredited by the Austrian Government, is evaluated by the International Baccalaureate Organisation (IBO).

History

The school began in 1990 as a response to quotas imposed by the other International Schools in Vienna which had restrictions on the number of Austrians that could attend their schools.  The school started as 'Pawen International Community School' with 9 students but by the end of the first year in June 1992 the intake had risen to over 170 students. The school reformed as Danube International School Vienna in 1992 and international students were allowed to enroll.  The school outgrew the first building in Schrutkagasse in the 13th District of Vienna (which now houses a Rudolf Steiner School), and then  relocated to a building at Gudrunstrasse 184, in the 10th District, which was home to DISV for 7 years - from 1992 to 1999 before moving to its current site.

References

 Official School Site

International schools in Vienna
Private schools in Austria
International Baccalaureate schools in Austria
Educational institutions established in 1990
1990 establishments in Austria